Dennis Lukens (born June 28, 1952) is an American professional soccer coach and former player.

Playing career
Lukens played college soccer for Springfield College, and professionally for the Boston Storm. He was the founder of the Boston Storm.

Coaching career
He began his career as a coach with Bridgewater State College between 1988 and 1991.

Lukens has been on the coaching staff of clubs such as the California Cougars (where he was Assistant Coach), and he was also Head Coach of both the Boston Storm, and the Bay Area Seals.

He has also been Head Coach of the Saint Lucia under-23 national team, as well as Krystal Kherson in the Ukrainian Second League. Lukens became the first American to coach soccer in the former Soviet Union, and the first to coach in the Ukraine. In January 2014 he was one of six American coaches working professionally in Europe.

Lukens has also been Director of Coaching for the Massachusetts Youth Soccer Association, and he has worked with the United States Soccer Federation.

He took over as manager of Ukrainian club Sudnobudivnyk Mykolaiv in 2016. He also works as the club's president.

Later Lukens has been Technical Director for the Elite Development Academy out of Fullerton, California.

In 2020, Lukens became involved with Dublin County as team manager and chairman, in their bid to enter the League of Ireland First Division. Their bid was unsuccessful due to the club's issues in securing Morton Stadium for home games. Despite having two full-time staff and arranging 20 playing contracts, they lost out to Treaty United.

References

1952 births
Living people
American soccer players
Boston Storm players
American soccer coaches
American expatriate soccer coaches
Expatriate football managers in Ukraine
American expatriate sportspeople in Ukraine
FC Krystal Kherson managers
Association footballers not categorized by position
Expatriate football managers in the Republic of Ireland
American expatriates in the Republic of Ireland
Expatriate football managers in Saint Lucia
American expatriates in Saint Lucia